Aglaia erythrosperma is a species of plant in the family Meliaceae. It is found in Indonesia, Malaysia, and Thailand.

References

erythrosperma
Near threatened plants
Taxonomy articles created by Polbot